Brias is a commune in the Pas-de-Calais department in the Hauts-de-France region in northern France.

Geography
A farming village located 22 miles (35 km) northwest of Arras on the N41 road, at the junction with the D81.

History
First mentioned in 1212, as the fiefdom of Gille de la Tourette.
The château of Bryas served as headquarters for Marshal Foch during the Second Battle of Artois, in 1915. The commune agreed to change the spelling of the name from Bryas in 1997.

Population

Sights
 The church of St. Martin
 The château, rebuilt between 1789 and 1805

See also
Communes of the Pas-de-Calais department

References

Communes of Pas-de-Calais